Lou Perez is an American professional wrestler who has competed in North American promotions including the National Wrestling Alliance and World Championship Wrestling during the late 1980s and early 1990s as well as the Puerto Rican-based promotion IWA Puerto Rico.

Although billed as the younger brother of Al Perez, Lou Perez is actually his cousin.

Career
Trained by Boris Malenko, Perez began wrestling in Championship Wrestling from Florida in late 1988 facing Scotty the Body and later teamed with Rex King and Austin in a 6-man tag team match against Scotty the Body, Bob Cook and Jim Backlund. Briefly appearing in the Professional Wrestling Federation the following year, Perez feuded with PWF Junior Heavyweight Champion Jim Backlund facing him on March 11, 1989.

Perez became a mainstay in the area within several years and later teamed with Mark Starr to defeat Jumbo Baretta & Dennis Knight for the NWA Florida Tag Team Championship in Tampa, Florida on November 12, 1989. He also had a short stint in World Championship Wrestling, defeating Mike Thor in his debut match in 1990.

Feuding with Steve Keirn over the NWA Florida Heavyweight Championship, he defeated Keirn for the title in Winter Haven, Florida in July 1992. Trading the title with Kiern twice during the next two years, before being forced to surrender the title on November 6, 1995 after suffering a knee injury.

He also competed in several other promotions during this time, feuding with the Cuban Assassin while in the World Wrestling Alliance and teamed with Rico Federico to defeat the Southern Posse to win the IPWA Tag Team titles while in the International Pro wrestling Association during early 1994. He also faced the Black Assassin and Hercules in various independent promotions later during the year.

During an interpromotional event between the National Wrestling Alliance and Smoky Mountain Wrestling, he participated in the 1994 NWA World Heavyweight Championship Tournament fighting Osamu Nishimura to a time limit draw in the opening rounds in Cherry Hill, New Jersey on November 19, 1994.

Championships and accomplishments
International Pro Wrestling Alliance
IPWA Tag Team Championship (1 time) with Rico Federico 

Championship Wrestling from Florida
NWA Florida Heavyweight Championship (3 times) 
NWA Florida Tag Team Championship (6 times) - with Mark Starr 

Pro Wrestling Federation
PWF Light Heavyweight Championship (1 times) 

Other titles
FWA Heavyweight Championship (1 time)
PCWF Heavyweight Championship (1 time)

Pro Wrestling Illustrated
PWI ranked him # 180 of the 500 best singles wrestlers of the PWI 500 in 1991

References

External links
Profile at Online World of Wrestling

Year of birth missing (living people)
Living people
American male professional wrestlers
20th-century professional wrestlers
NWA Florida Heavyweight Champions
NWA Florida Tag Team Champions